Michael Debabrata Patra is an Indian economist and central banker. A career Reserve Bank of India officer, he is currently serving as one its fourdeputy governors.

Education 
Born in Cuttack, Odisha, into an Odia  Christian family, Michael Debebrata Patra did his graduation from the Ravenshaw College and post graduation from Utkal University. Patra has a PhD in economics from the Indian Institute of Technology Bombay in Mumbai, with his thesis being titled "The Role of Invisibles in India's Balance of Payments: A Structural Approach". Patra proceeded to do post-doctoral research on financial stability at Harvard University as a fellow.

Patra received professional training at IMF Institute on Financial Programming and Policy and at the Bank of England's Centre for Central Banking Studies.

Career 
Patra is a career central bank officer who joined the Reserve Bank of India (RBI) in 1985. Before his appointment as deputy governor, Patra served as the executive director of the monetary policy department of RBI—where he moved to in 2006—and as such, was an internal member of the powerful Monetary Policy Committee. Earlier, Patra served as an adviser in charge of international finance, money, and banking in RBI's department of economic analysis.

From December 2008 and June 2012, Patra served on deputation to the International Monetary Fund as senior adviser to India's executive director at the fund.

Deputy Governor 
In January 2020, Patra was appointed a Deputy Governor of the Reserve Bank of India by the Appointments Committee of the Cabinet—on the recommendation of the Cabinet Secretary-headed Financial Sector Regulatory Appointment Search Committee—for a period of threeyears, succeeding Viral Acharya, who had resigned in July 2019. With his appointment as deputy governor, Patra became the first RBI career economist to be elevated to the position.

Patra took charge as deputy governor on 15 January 2020, and was assigned to look after RBI's monetary policy department, financial markets operations department, financial markets regulation department, international department, department of economic and policy research, department of statistics and information management, corporate strategy and budget department and financial stability unit. As the deputy governor in charge of the monetary policy department, Patra became an ex-officio member of the Monetary Policy Committee.

Work

References 

Indian civil servants
Indian bankers
Central bankers
IIT Bombay alumni
21st-century Indian economists
20th-century Indian economists
Harvard University alumni
People from Cuttack district
Living people
Date of birth missing (living people)
Year of birth missing (living people)
Reserve Bank of India